Jonzing World is a Nigerian record label and management company which was founded by a recording artist D'Prince on 22 March 2019. Jonzing services includes, music recording, merchandising, audiovisual content, branding, and management. The label currently houses artists like Rema, Ruger with its founder D'Prince.

History 
On 22 March 2019, Charles Enebeli D'Prince founded Jonzing World, and unveiled Rema as its first signee. Shortly after the announcement, Don Jazzy welcomed Rema to Mavin Global, a unit of Mavin Records. Same day, Rema released his eponymous debut extended play Rema, which peaked at number 1 on Apple Music Nigeria. On 19 January 2021, the label signed Ruger, through Sony Music West Africa with joint venture with Columbia Records, and Sony Music, with no affiliation with Mavin Records unit Mavin Global, say's D'Prince.

On 5 March 2021, Jonzing World debut Ruger extended play Pandemic, through Sony Music unit Sony Music Entertainment UK.

Artists

Current acts

Discography

Albums

Singles

References 

Labels distributed by Mavin Records
Mavin Records subsidiaries
Nigerian record labels
Pop record labels
Record labels established in 2019